Dybowo  is a village in the administrative district of Gmina Świętajno, within Olecko County, Warmian-Masurian Voivodeship, in north-eastern Poland. It is part of the region of Masuria.

History
Dybowo was founded in 1564 by Jan Dybowski, who bought land to establish a village. It was named after the founder. As of 1600, the population of the village was solely Polish. In 1939, it had a population of 359.

References

Dybowo
1564 establishments in Poland
Populated places established in 1564